Patrick Joseph Harrington (born 12 September 1939) is the Bishop-emeritus of the Diocese of Lodwar in Kenya.

He was born in Kilmeague, County Kildare, Ireland.  He was ordained a priest on 16 December 1963 for the Society of African Missions. He was General superior of the SAM between 1985 and 1993. On 17 February 2000 he was appointed Bishop of Lodwar.  He was ordained a bishop on 20 March of the same year. The principal consecrator was Cardinal Jozef Tomko; his principal co-consecrators were Bishop John Christopher Mahon, S.P.S, and Archbishop Zacchaeus Okoth. He resigned as Bishop of Lodwar on 5 March 2011 and was succeeded in this office by Dominic Kimengich.

References

Irish expatriate Catholic bishops
People from County Kildare
1939 births
Living people
21st-century Roman Catholic bishops in Kenya
Roman Catholic bishops of Lodwar